A virago is a strong, brave, or warlike woman.

Virago may also refer to:

Media
 Virago Press, a British publishing company
 Virago (EP), a 1999 EP by Theatre of Tragedy
 "Virago", a song from the 2005 album Razorbliss by Flowing Tears
 Virago, a fictional Star Wars spacecraft
 Virago, a fictional crimefighter slain by the supervillain Onomatopoeia in the comic book Green Arrow
 Virago, an American production company in Denver in the 1970s

Ships
 HMS Virago, four ships of the British Royal Navy, including:
 HMS Virago (1842), a Driver-class wooden paddle sloop
 HMS Virago (1895), a B-class torpedo boat destroyer
 HMS Virago (R75), a World War II V-class destroyer

Other uses
 Virago sleeve, a women's clothing fashion of the early 17th century
 Virago Sound, on the north coast of Graham Island, Queen Charlotte Islands, British Columbia, Canada
 Yamaha Virago, a series of motorcycles, produced from 1981 to 2007
 Virago (horse)